Richard R. Nacy (November 7, 1895 – January 10, 1961) was an American politician from Missouri.

Biography
Nacy was born and raised in Jefferson City, Missouri. As a young boy, he was a very talented baseball player and was heavily scouted by the major leagues. However, his father died when he was 16, and he had to quit school to help support his family.

During World War I, he served in the Allied Expeditionary Forces in France. Following the war, he was elected as City Clerk of Jefferson City in June 1919, serving in that post for nearly four years. In February 1920, he was married to the former Anna F. Dorsey and had three sons.

In January 1923, he became Circuit Court Clerk of Cole County, Missouri, and was reelected to two additional terms in 1926 and 1930. In 1932, he was elected as State Treasurer of Missouri. During his tenure, the state endured one of the most distressing times in banking history due to the Great Depression. 

Upon completion of his term as state treasurer in January 1937, he became a vice president at the Jefferson City-based Central Missouri Trust Company and was active in local, state, and national politics.

He was a delegate to the 1943 Missouri Constitutional Convention and was a regularly-appearing delegate to the Democratic National Convention until his death. During President Harry S. Truman's first term, he served as Executive Vice Chairman of the Democratic National Committee in Washington. From August 1948 to January 1949, he served as state treasurer again, filling a vacancy created by the death of incumbent Robert W. Winn. Upon completion of his second term as state treasurer, he returned to Central Missouri Trust Company, where he served as president until his death. He was mentioned in Theodore H. White’s book "The Making of a President 1960" as being instrumental in bringing conservative Missouri into the John F. Kennedy camp and helping ensure Kennedy's election in 1960. He died just ten days before the inauguration, to which he and his wife had been invited.

References

1895 births
1961 deaths
United States Army personnel of World War I
Military personnel from Missouri
People from Jefferson City, Missouri
Nacy, Richardm R.
Missouri Democrats
20th-century American politicians